Leedy is a surname. Notable people with the surname include:

Denoe Leedy (1900–1964), American classical pianist, music educator and music journalist
Gene Leedy (1928–2018), American architect 
Harold Gavin Leedy (1892–1989), American Federal Reserve president
James K. Leedy (1925–1983), American politician
John W. Leedy (1849–1935), American politician
Robert Franklin Leedy (1863–1924), American lawyer, soldier and politician
Ulysses G. Leedy (1867–1931), founder of the Leedy Manufacturing Company
Walter C. Leedy (d. 2006), American architectural historian